This is a list of speakers of the National Parliament of Papua New Guinea:'

Sources
PNG speakers of Parliament

Politics of Papua New Guinea
Papua New Guinea
Speakers of the National Parliament of Papua New Guinea